Subash Chakraborty (born 4 April 1985) is an Indian cricketer who plays for Tripura. He made his first-class debut on 7 November 2015 in the 2015–16 Ranji Trophy.

References

External links
 

1985 births
Living people
Indian cricketers
Tripura cricketers
Place of birth missing (living people)